Princess Isabel Alfonsa of Bourbon-Two Sicilies, Infanta of Spain, (Isabel Alfonsa María Teresa Antonia Cristina Mercedes Carolina Adelaida Rafaela de Borbón-Dos Sicilias y Borbón; 16 October 1904 – 18 July 1985) was a member of the House of Bourbon-Two Sicilies and a princess of Bourbon-Two Sicilies by birth. Through her marriage to Count Jan Kanty Zamoyski, she was a member of the Zamoyski noble family and a Countess Zamoyska.

Family
Isabel Alfonsa was the third child of Prince Carlos of Bourbon-Two Sicilies and his first wife Mercedes, Princess of Asturias. Her mother was the heiress presumptive to the Spanish Throne from 11 September 1880 to 17 October 1904. She died one day after the labor. Isabel Alfonsa's maternal grandparents were Alfonso XII of Spain and Maria Christina of Austria. Through her father, she was a great-granddaughter of Ferdinand II of the Two Sicilies.

Marriage and issue
Isabel Alfonsa married her first cousin once removed Count Jan Kanty Zamoyski, seventh child and third son of Count Andrzej Zamoyski and his wife Princess Maria Carolina of Bourbon-Two Sicilies, on 9 March 1929 in Madrid. She and Jan had four children:

 Count Karol Alfons Zamoyski (28 October 1930 – 26 October 1979)
 Countess Maria Krystyna Zamoyska (2 September 1932 – 6 December 1959)
 Count Józef Michal Zamoyski (born 27 June 1935-22/23 May 2010)
 Countess Maria Teresa Zamoyska (born 18 April 1938)
In 1929–1945 the family lived in Czechoslovakia in the town of Stará Ľubovňa.

Honours
 Dame Grand Cross of Justice of the Sacred Military Constantinian Order of Saint George
 Dame of the Order of Queen Maria Luisa

Arms

Ancestry

References

1904 births
1985 deaths
Zamoyski family
Princesses of Bourbon-Two Sicilies
Nobility from Madrid
Spanish infantas
Burials in the Pantheon of Infantes at El Escorial